This is a list of faculties of law in Austria.
 Karl-Franzens-University - Rechtswissenschaftlichen Fakultät 
 University of Innsbruck - Rechtswissenschaftliche Fakultät 
 Johannes Kepler University - Faculty of Law, Linz
  Universität Salzburg - Rechtswissenschaftliche Fakultät 
 University of Vienna - Rechtswissenschaftliche Fakultät

References 

Austria
Education in Austria
Austria education-related lists